The 1921 Green Bay Packers season was their third season of competition and their first in the American Professional Football Association. The team finished with a 3–2–1 league record under player and coach Curly Lambeau, earning them a seventh-place finish.

After the season the Packers were removed from the league, following their acknowledgment of using Notre Dame players during the season, who played under assumed names. Green Bay would return to the NFL a year later as a "new franchise".

Schedule

 Games in italics are against non-NFL opponents.

Roster

Standings

References

 Sportsencyclopedia.com
 1921 Green Bay Packers (APFA)

Green Bay Packers seasons
Green Bay Packers
Green Bay Packers